Rubble may refer to:

 Rubble, stone debris/fragments
 Rubble masonry
 Rubble pile, in astronomy
 Riprap
 Rubble Crab, a type of crab
 Rubble Creek, in southwestern British Columbia, Canada

Entertainment

 Rubble film
 Rubble literature
 Rubble series, compilation albums of late-1960s British psychedelic rock
 The Rubbles, Barney and Betty Rubble (and other characters from their family) from the Flintstones animated television and live action film series
 Ragged Rubble, post hardcore music album
 Rubble, a character from PAW Patrol

See also
 
 
 Rubblization
 Ruble
 Debris